Queen Elizabeth's Foundation for Disabled People is a charity that works with both children and adults with physical and learning disabilities or acquired brain injuries to help them gain new skills and increase their independence, helping them to achieve their goals for life. Its name is abbreviated to 'QEF'.

QEF operates a brain injury centre in Banstead and a mobility centre in Carshalton, as well as independent living services in Leatherhead in Surrey. It also operates a chain of charity shops in the south east of England.

The president of QEF is Corinna, Lady Hamilton of Dalzell, DL. The chairman is Peter Gordon. The charity's chief executive is Karen Deacon.

The QEF family of charities also comprises the partner charities: Medical Engineering Resource Unit (MERU), Voluntary Association for Surrey Disabled (VASD), and Sutton Shopmobility.

Patronage

Queen Elizabeth The Queen Mother had a personal interest in the charity throughout her life, offering encouragement around the original proposals, to formally opening the Cripple's Training College on 27 June 1935 as the Duchess of York. As Queen she visited in 1941 and requested that the charity should be renamed Queen Elizabeth's Training College for the Disabled. Queen Elizabeth The Queen Mother visited a total of eight times, each visit being treasured by the trainees, residents, and staff. On 1 January 1967, the College was renamed Queen Elizabeth's Foundation in order to reflect the range of services the charity offered in addition to the training college.

History
Queen Elizabeth's Foundation for Disabled People was founded in 1932 by Dame Georgiana Buller, the Vice Chairman of the Central Council for the Care of Cripples. It opened as a vocational training college in 1934 under the name the Cripples' Training College, taking physically disabled trainees with conditions such as paralysis and tuberculosis. A women's section was set up in 1946.

In 1948 the foundation acquired the Dorincourt Estates in Leatherhead and in 1956 set up Banstead Place Medical Rehabilitation Centre. The College and the facilities at the Dorincourt Estates were amalgamated to become Queen Elizabeth's Foundation for the Disabled in 1967. The college developed a vocational approach to training disabled people and expanded to run workshops in areas such as engineering draughtsmanship and computer programming, as well as a mobility scheme.

Family of Charities

The Foundation works with three other small charities: MERU, which designs and builds assistive equipment for children and young people with disabilities and is based in Epsom; Sutton Shopmobility, providing rental mobility equipment for people with disabilities; and VASD, which provides wheelchair accessible holidays and disability products.

References

External links
Website

Elizabeth's
1932 establishments in England
Organizations established in 1932
Queen Elizabeth The Queen Mother
Charities based in Surrey
South East England
Charities for disabled people based in the United Kingdom